Al Kharayej is a district in Qatar, geographically located in the municipality of Al Daayen but also included in the census as a district of Ad-Dawhah. After a cabinet resolution was passed in 2002, Al Kharayej became the one of three settlements in Qatar where foreigners could own real estate. It is a part of Lusail city.

Etymology
Traditionally an agricultural settlement, Al Kharayej is named after a local saline spring, with "kharayej" being an Arabic term for saline spring. Many salt-tolerant forages grow around this spring, thus it was a popular grazing area for nomadic herdsman.

Geography
Located in the southeast corner of Al Daayen, Al Kharayej borders Al Kheesa and Wadi Al Banat to the west, Al Egla to the south and Lusail to the north. To the east it is surrounded by the Persian Gulf.

References

Populated places in Al Daayen
Communities in Doha